David John Tremayne is a UK-based motor racing journalist.  He has written extensively about the Land Speed Record.  

He was the Formula One correspondent for The Independent.

He is one of the founding partners of GrandPrix+, the sport's first e-magazine, with fellow journalist Joe Saward. GrandPrix+ won the 2007 Guild of Motoring Writers Newspress New Media Award.

Awards
He was the 1990, 2001 and 2004 winner of the Guild of Motoring Writers Journalist of the Year Award.

Publications

Books (incomplete list) 
In order of date published

 

— (5 April 2018). Jim Clark: The best of the best. UK: Evro Publishing.

Web
 Donald Campbell: The Man in the Shadow
 Dynamo Dean and the Griffon Bud: an ill-starred love affair

References

Living people
Year of birth missing (living people)
British motoring journalists
Historians of motorsport
Formula One journalists and reporters
English motorsport people
Place of birth missing (living people)